Fiona Dutriaux (born 25 January 1989 in Croix) is a French former professional racing cyclist. On the track she competed in several world cups and European Championships. She won several medals at the French National Track Championships, including a gold in the scratch in 2009 and a gold in the points race in 2010. On the road, she rode for the  team between 2007 and 2014. Dutriaux represented her country in the road race at the 2015 European Games in Baku, Azerbaijan.

Major results

2007
 1st  Individual pursuit, UEC European Junior Track Championships
2014
 3rd Omnium, Open des Nations sur Piste de Roubaix
 5th Diamond Tour
 7th Erondegemse Pijl
2015
 6th Diamond Tour
 9th Dwars door Vlaanderen

References

External links

1989 births
Living people
French female cyclists
People from Croix, Nord
Cyclists at the 2015 European Games
European Games competitors for France
Sportspeople from Nord (French department)
Cyclists from Hauts-de-France